Beverley Township was a township established in 1792 in Home District in the then Upper Canada, today Ontario, Canada. It was named for the town of Beverley in the East Riding of Yorkshire, England, by John Graves Simcoe.

The township became part of Halton County when that county was created as part of Gore District in 1816. The township was also known as Beverly Township when it was transferred to Wentworth County in 1853. When the Regional Municipality of Hamilton–Wentworth was created in 1974, most of Beverley Township was absorbed by Flamborough, Ontario. The area is now part of the city of Hamilton.

See also

List of townships in Ontario
Westover, Ontario

References 

Geographic townships in Ontario